Marinomonas dokdonensis is a Gram-negative, non-spore-forming, slightly halophilic and motile bacterium from the genus of Marinomonas which has been isolated from sea water from Korea.

References

Oceanospirillales
Bacteria described in 2005